Velika Črešnjevica  is a village in Croatia.

Populated places in Virovitica-Podravina County